The women's field hockey tournament at the 2007 Pan American Games was held between 15–24 July 2007 in Rio de Janeiro, Brazil. The tournament doubled as the qualification to the 2008 Summer Olympics to be held in Beijing, China.

Argentina won the tournament for the sixth time after defeating the United States 4–2 in the final. Netherlands Antilles won the bronze medal after defeating Chile 2–1 in the third place playoff.

Qualification

Umpires
Below are the 10 umpires appointed by the Pan American Hockey Federation:

 Julie Ashton-Lucy (AUS)
 Caroline Brunekreef (NED)
 Amy Hassick (USA)
 Soledad Iparraguirre (ARG)
 Stephanie Judefind (USA)
 Ayanna McClean (TTO)
 Maritza Perez Castro (URU)
 Mercedes Sanchez Moyano (ARG)
 Emma Simmons (BER)
 Wendy Stewart (CAN)

Results

Preliminary round

Pool A

Pool B

Classification round

Fifth to eighth place classification

Crossover

Seventh and eighth place

Fifth and sixth place

First to fourth place classification

Semi-finals

Bronze-medal match

Gold-medal match

Final standings

 Qualified for the Summer Olympics

Medalists

References

External links
Official website
Official PAHF website

Women's tournament
Pan American Games
2007 Pan American Games
Women's events at the 2007 Pan American Games
Pan American Games
2007